Dabo (born 1975) is Japanese hip-hop artist.

Dabo may also refer to:

 Dabo (mountain) (647 m), a mountain in the Vosges, France
 Dabo (Star Trek), game of chance shown in Star Trek
 Dabo, Mali, commune in Mali
 Dabo, Moselle, commune of the Moselle département, France 
 Dabo Swinney (born 1969), American football coach
 Baciro Dabó (1958–2009), Guinea-Bissauan politician
 Mouhamadou Dabo (born 1986), French footballer
 Ousmane Dabo (born 1977), French footballer

See also
 Dabotap, pagoda located in Bulguk Temple in Gyeongju, South Korea